Nove is a town and comune in the province of Vicenza in the region of Veneto, north-eastern Italy, with just over 5,000 inhabitants. It is located on the Brenta river, near Marostica and Bassano del Grappa.

The town is home of a local network of ceramic industries.

The name of the town comes from the antique Italian nove, in the meaning of "new". As matter of fact, the lands where the town is located were considered new because of the lowering of the level of the Brenta. The lowering of the river revealed soft lands rich of clay. The first artisans of the area started using the clay for the production of pottery.

The town have a beautiful ceramic museum with a Pablo Picasso gallipot and other important pieces of the 18th and 19th century.

International relations

Nove is twinned with:
 Welkenraedt, Belgium
 Langhirano, Italy
 Montelupo Fiorentino, Italy
 Carlos Barbosa, Brazil

References

External links

traditional ceramic whistles of Nove, so-called "Cuchi"

Cities and towns in Veneto